The superior labial vein is the vein receiving blood from the upper lip.

Additional images

External links

Veins of the head and neck